Creetown railway station served the town of Creetown, Dumfries and Galloway, Scotland from 1861 to 1965 on the Portpatrick and Wigtownshire Joint Railway.

History 
The station opened on 12 March 1861 by the Portpatrick and Wigtownshire Joint Railway. The signal box was at the east end of the westbound platform and the goods yard was to the south. The station closed to both passengers and goods traffic on 14 June 1965.

References

External links 

Disused railway stations in Dumfries and Galloway
Former Portpatrick and Wigtownshire Joint Railway stations
Railway stations in Great Britain opened in 1861
Railway stations in Great Britain closed in 1965
Beeching closures in Scotland
1861 establishments in Scotland
1965 disestablishments in Scotland